Śmierć Kliniczna (Polish for clinical death) was a Polish punk rock band, founded in Gliwice in 1981 by Dariusz Dusza (guitar), Wojciech Jaczyczko (bass guitar), Marek Czapelski (drums) and Jerzy Mercik (vocal). Along with Dezerter, KSU and Brygada Kryzys, Smierc Kliniczna was one of the most popular early punk rock bands in Poland. It played at the 1982 Jarocin Festival, and next year, with a second vocalist, Jacek Szafir, the band played several concerts, among others at the Opole Festival, Jarocin Festival, Rockowisko in Lodz and FAMA Festival in Swinoujscie. After the 1984 Jarocin Festival, Smierc Kliniczna was disbanded; Dariusz Dusza founded punk-rock band Absurd and the remaining musicians founded Reggae Against Politics (better known as R.A.P.), a reggae band, very popular in Poland in mid-1980s.

Line-up
 Jerzy Mercik - Vocals
 Jacek Szafir - Vocals
 Dariusz Dusza - Guitar
 Wojciech Jaczyczko - Bass
 Marek Czapelski - Percussions
 Piotr Malak - Saxophone
 Mateusz Pospieszalski - Saxophone
 Ziut Gralak - Trumpet

Discography
 Nasza Edukacja / Nienormalny Swiat 7" (Tonpress Records) 1983
 ASP / Jestem Ziarnkiem Piasku 7" (Tonpress Records) 1984
 1982-1984 CD (Jimmy Jazz Records) 2001

Polish punk rock groups